Martin Skaba (born 28 July 1935) is a German former footballer.  Skaba came to  SC Dynamo Berlin as a 19-year old in 1956. He made his first match for the first team of SC Dynamo Berlin in the 1956 DDR-Oberliga. Skaba won the FDGB-Pokal with SC Dynamo Berlin in 1959. He ended his playing career in 1968. Skaba played in 255 league matches for SC Dynamo Berlin and BFC Dynamo. He also played in eight matches for the East Germany national football team from 1958 to 1963. 

Skaba continued as a trainer in BFC Dynamo after ending his playing career. He coached the reserve team of BFC Dynamo in the second tier DDR-Liga from 1971 to 1974. BFC Dynamo II under Skaba won the 1971-72 DDR-Liga Staffel B. Skaba then served as the first assistant coach of Jürgen Bogs in the DDR-Oberliga. Skaba later went to Mozambique, where he trained local coaches. He continued as youth trainer in BFC Dynamo and FC Berlin after returning from Africa.

Gallery

Notes

References

External links
 

1935 births
Living people
East German footballers
East Germany international footballers
Berliner FC Dynamo players
Place of birth missing (living people)
Association football defenders